The Singles 1981–1983 is a greatest hits mini-album by English post-punk band Bauhaus. It was released in 1983 by record label Beggars Banquet.

Content 

The version of "Ziggy Stardust" included on the EP is taken from the live session recorded for the BBC Radio 1 David Jensen Show which was first broadcast on 22 July 1982.

Track listing

Personnel 
 Bauhaus

 Daniel Ash – guitar, backing vocals, production
 David J – bass guitar, backing vocals, production
 Kevin Haskins – drums, percussion
 Peter Murphy – lead vocals, production

 Technical

 Hugh Jones – production on "Spirit"
 John Sparrow – production on "Ziggy Stardust"
 Derek Tomkins – engineering on "Lagartija Nick" and "She's in Parties"

References

External links 

 

1983 EPs
Bauhaus (band) albums
1983 compilation albums
Beggars Banquet Records EPs
Beggars Banquet Records compilation albums